Gordon Calvin "Gordy" Coleman (July 5, 1934 – March 12, 1994) was a professional baseball first baseman. He played in Major League Baseball with the Cleveland Indians and Cincinnati Reds. He helped the Reds win the 1961 National League pennant, and was inducted into the Cincinnati Reds Hall of Fame in 1972. 

In nine Major League seasons, he appeared in 773 games, totaled 98 home runs, 387 runs batted in, and compiled a .273 batting average.

Early life and career
Gordy Coleman was born July 5, 1934, in Rockville, Maryland. He was a star athlete at Richard Montgomery High School, earning letters in baseball, football, basketball, and track. He was All-State in football, led the school's basketball team to the state finals his senior year, and in baseball he excelled as both a pitcher and a hitter.

He attended Duke University on a football scholarship, playing both baseball and football as a freshman.

Coleman was signed as an amateur free agent by the Cleveland Indians prior to the 1953 season at age 18 and assigned to the Reading Indians of the Eastern League. He was an outfielder until being converted to a first baseman in the spring of 1956.

He was out of baseball in 1957 and 1958 while serving in the U.S. Army at Fort McPherson, Georgia.

Returning to baseball in 1959, with the Indians' AA affiliate Mobile Bears of the Southern Association (for whom he had played in 1956), he won the Triple Crown with 30 home runs, 110 runs batted in and a .353 average, earning a promotion to the parent club.

Coleman made his Major League debut for the Indians on Sept. 19, 1959 at age 25 in a game hosted by the Kansas City Athletics and won by the Indians, 13-7. In one at-bat as a pinch hitter, he got his first big-league hit, a fifth-inning triple off Bob Grim.

After one season with Cleveland, he was traded with Billy Martin and Cal McLish to the Cincinnati Reds for Johnny Temple.  In 1960 he split time with the Reds, for whom he played 66 games, and the Reds' AAA affiliate Seattle Rainiers of the Pacific Coast League.

In the 1961 World Series against the New York Yankees, Coleman batted .250 (5 for 20) with 1 home run and 2 runs batted in. His two-run homer came in game 2 at Yankee Stadium in the fourth inning off starting pitcher Ralph Terry in a 6-2 Reds' win, their only one of the series.

He was the Reds' starting first baseman in the 1961 through 1963 seasons, then in the following four seasons he split time at first base with Deron Johnson and later Tony Pérez. In 1967, his last in the Major Leagues, he played in two games for the Reds, playing most of the year with the Reds' AAA affiliate in the International League the Buffalo Bisons and later with the Los Angeles Dodgers' AAA affiliate the Spokane Indians, hitting a combined .197.

Later career
After his playing career ended, beginning in 1968, Coleman worked for many years in public relations for the Cincinnati Reds as director of the team's speakers bureau, making hundreds of appearances speaking at civic and other organizations' events. He also served as a color commentator on Reds TV broadcasts from 1990 to 1994.

Personal life
Coleman married Marian Huggins (b. 1934) on October 12, 1955; she still resides in Cincinnati. They had a son, Shawn.

Coleman died of a heart attack at age 59 on March 12, 1994, in Cincinnati, Ohio. The city of his birth, Rockville, Maryland, declared July 5, 2008, (what would have been his 74th birthday) Gordy Coleman Day after a group of Richard Montgomery High School alumni sought to raise funds for a new baseball field scoreboard and plaque commemorating Coleman's life and to name the field in his honor.

References

External links

1934 births
1994 deaths
Baseball players from Maryland
Buffalo Bisons (minor league) players
Cincinnati Reds announcers
Cincinnati Reds players
Cleveland Indians players
Indianapolis Indians players
Keokuk Kernels players
Major League Baseball broadcasters
Major League Baseball first basemen
Mobile Bears players
Reading Indians players
Seattle Rainiers players
Spartanburg Peaches players
Spokane Indians players
Sportspeople from Rockville, Maryland